Aulattivik (Inuktitut syllabics: ᐊᐅᓚᑦᑎᕕᒃ) formerly Curry Island is an irregularly shaped, uninhabited island located in the Qikiqtaaluk Region of Nunavut, Canada. It is located at the mouth of White Bay, off Baffin Island. Eclipse Sound lies to its north.

References

Islands of Baffin Island
Uninhabited islands of Qikiqtaaluk Region